Interdom (Ivanovo International Boarding School) is a special school for foreigners located in the city of Ivanovo in Russia. The name is an abbreviation of the Russian internatzionalny dom or "International House".

It was created in on March 26, 1933 by the textile women of the city under the direction of the Soviet section of International Red Aid (also known as МОPR, its Russian acronym). The boarding school was later named after founder Elena Dmitrievna Stasova. It was conceived as a school for children of repressed democratic leaders and activists from all over the world.

Interdom underwent major extensions in the years 1961, 1969 and especially around 1990.

As the Soviet Union collapsed, Interdom also became home for many children victims of the Chernobyl disaster. At the beginning of the 21st century plans to transform the international school into a military academy for cadets (see Suvorov Military School) were successfully blocked. This was achieved thanks to a major effort by the school staff, the Russian Red Cross and the prompt response of the Russian Committee for Peace, in particular the influence of its president, the former chess world champion Anatoly Karpov.

External links
Interdom Graduates Association site 
Article in BBC News published in October 2013

Schools in Russia
Ivanovo
International high schools
Education in the Soviet Union
Foreign relations of the Soviet Union